Gary Hill is an American artist.

Gary or Garry Hill may also refer to:
Gary Hill (basketball) (1941–2009), basketball player 
Garry Hill (born 1959), English football manager
Garry Hill (baseball) (1946–2017), American baseball player